Sagar is an Indian playback singer, lyricist and dialogue writer who predominantly works in Telugu cinema and Telugu music. He started his singing career  with the film Varsham (2004), composed by his brother Devi Sri Prasad. "Top Lechipoddi", "Sailaja Sailaja", "Nannaku Prematho", "Pakka Local", "Jatha Kalise", "Nammaka Thappani" and "Hello Guru Prema Kosame" are some of his popular songs.

Personal life and career 
Sagar started his career with the film Varsham (2004) and then sang around 80 songs. He has mostly collaborated with his brother Devi Sri Prasad in playback singing. In June 2019, he married Dr. Mounica Sagar. He turned into dialogue writer with the film Rakshasudu. He is the son of veteran writer G. Satyamurthy, who died on 14 December 2015.

Discography

As Playback singer

As lyricist

As composer

Filmography

As Dialogue writer

Awards and nominations

References 

Living people
Telugu playback singers
People from East Godavari district
Musicians from Andhra Pradesh
Singers from Andhra Pradesh
Writers from Andhra Pradesh
21st-century Indian male singers
21st-century Indian singers
Indian composers
Filmfare Awards South winners
International Indian Film Academy Awards winners
South Indian International Movie Awards winners
Year of birth missing (living people)